Richard Bruce Shull (February 24, 1929 – October 14, 1999) was an American character actor.

Biography

Early life

Shull was born in Evanston, Illinois, the son of Zana Marie (née Brown), a court stenographer, and Ulysses Homer Shull, a manufacturing executive. He attended York High School (Elmhurst, Illinois) and the University of Iowa. He served in the U.S. Army before starting his Broadway career as a stage manager.

Acting career
He got his first big break as an actor when he was cast in Minnie's Boys in 1970. Additional theatre credits include Goodtime Charley (in which he sang a duet "Merci, Bon Dieu"; and for which he received Tony and Drama Desk Award nominations), Fools, The Front Page, A Flea in Her Ear, and Victor/Victoria.

Shull's screen credits include thirty movies,  The Anderson Tapes (1971), Klute (1971), Slither (1973), The Fortune (1975), Splash (1984), Garbo Talks (1984), Unfaithfully Yours (1984), Housesitter (1992) and Private Parts (1997).

His television appearances included Love, American Style in episode "Love and the Locksmith", Ironside "Once More for Joey" aired 1974, Good Times "The Visitor", The Rockford Files "The Great Blue Lake", Alice "Flo's Chili Reception", Diana co star, Lou Grant episode "Samaratan", Hart to Hart, and Holmes & Yoyo starred as a police detective, as well as numerous television movies. He also appeared as the judge in a music video for the song "Keeping the Faith" (1984), by Billy Joel. He appeared as the delivery man in Tales from the Darkside Do Not Open This Box (1988) series 4, episode 15. In 1963 Richard became a member of the historical theater club, The Lambs, served on its council and remained a member until his death.

Writing career
As a writer, Shull wrote the 1960 play Fenton's Folly, which was adapted as Fentons völlig verrückte Erfindung (1967), an independent German movie filmed in Austria. Shull also wrote the story for the 1966 thriller movie Aroused, and co-authored, with William L. Rose, the dramatic film Pamela, Pamela You are... (1968).

Death
Shull died of a heart attack while appearing in the play Epic Proportions in New York City. He was buried at 	
Kensico Cemetery in Valhalla, Westchester County, New York.

Hobbies and interests
In a 2012 interview, Shull's Holmes & Yoyo co-star John Schuck remembered him as "a very funny actor and a unique man," adding that Shull "lived in the ’40s. He bought ’40s clothing, he only used pen and ink, he had his own railroad car which he would attach to trains and travel around the country. He had a 1949 Chevrolet car. I mean, he truly lived in the past. Quite remarkable."

In 1995, Shull co-founded the North American Araucanian Royalist Society (NAARS) with Daniel Paul Morrison. The NAARS studies the Kingdom of Araucania and Patagonia which was founded in 1860 by the Mapuche people of South America.  The NAARS devoted a large portion of issue number 10 of their official journal, The Steel Crown, to the life of Shull.

Shull was an invested member of The Baker Street Irregulars, the literary society dedicated to Sherlock Holmes. He received his investiture "An Actor, and a Rare One," in 1986.

Shull was a member of the Players Club, the New York and the Sons of the Revolution in the State of NY.

Filmography

References

External links

North American Araucanian Royalist Society

1929 births
1999 deaths
American male film actors
American male musical theatre actors
American male stage actors
American male television actors
Male actors from Evanston, Illinois
University of Iowa alumni
Burials at Kensico Cemetery
20th-century American male actors
20th-century American male singers
20th-century American singers